R. J. Fetherstonhaugh is a Canadian actor. He is known for his portrayal of Nolan Gallard in 21 Thunder.

Early years
Fetherstonhaugh was born in Victoria, British Columbia and spent his childhood focused on athletics; he spent three years training in boxing in high school before deciding to pursue acting. He graduated from the Vancouver Film School in 2013.

In an interview, he credited his mother for pushing him towards acting:"My parents and I had a talk about my future, they were concerned about the physical trauma that comes with contact sports. I never saw boxing as a career path and frankly at that point in my life I didn't see any career path. My mother suggested I try acting and I fell in love with it. I've always been a bit of a storyteller so this line of work felt right."

Acting career
His first acting credits came in short films Mob Kingdom and Flying Embri in 2014. Later that year, he appeared in Supernatural episode Stairway to Heaven as Colonel Scoop's Employee. He featured in two episodes of When The Heart Calls in 2015 and earned a six-episode role as Sean in Wayward Pines a year later.

Fetherstonhaugh's first full-length movie appearance came as Justin Abraham in Kevan Funk's Hello Destroyer – which premiered at 2016 Toronto International Film Festival. He next appeared in television film Revenge Porn, as well as the series Dead of Summer.

In 2017, Fetherstonhaugh appeared in one episode of Somewhere Between as Blake Tanner before landing a leading role in 21 Thunder as Nolan Gallard. In 2018, he played featured roles in the films The Predator and How It Ends.

In 2021, Fetherstonhaugh worked in season two of Batwoman as Amygdala.

Filmography

Film

Television
Netflix Lou as Gerry

References

External links
 

Living people
Canadian male film actors
Year of birth missing (living people)